Ice hockey events at the Southeast Asian Games was first held at the 2017 edition in Kuala Lumpur, Malaysia.

History
In 2015, the South East Asian Games Federation approved Malaysia's proposal to introduce ice hockey and ice skating to the Southeast Asian Games. The 2017 Southeast Asian Games which was hosted by Malaysia was the first edition of the games where winter sports, including ice hockey, was contested. The Philippines won the first ice hockey gold medal.

Ice hockey is expected to be contested again in the 2019 edition which will be hosted by the Philippines. Malaysia has requested the Philippines to introduce a women's ice hockey event to the games. The hosts complied with Malaysia's request but a total of three nations only expressed their interest to participate in a women's tournament a team short in order for women's hockey to be a medal event.

Medal winners

Men

Medal table

References